Star Spencer High School is located in Oklahoma City, Oklahoma. In 1901 a group of people from Spencer County, Indiana relocated in Oklahoma. They built an elevator and mill, a grocery store and later a hardware store. They named their new town Spencer for their old home and eventually called their school Spencer as well. Star School (in a nearby area) was named by Henry Dodd in honor of a school in Kansas where he had lived previously. Two schools merged to become Star Spencer in 1956. The official mascot for the school is the Bobcats. Star Spencer is part of the Oklahoma City Public Schools.

Notable alumnus include Mr. Myron Jacobs and Mr. Daniel Peoples. Alumni also include Dr. Lahoma Hicks Schultz, noted psychologist, author and lecturer.
The football stadium (Carl Twidwell Stadium) was named after Carl Twidwell, athletic director, football coach, and vice principal.  

All graduates of Star Spencer High School, with a cumulative GPA of 2.5 or higher, have the opportunity to receive free tuition and mandatory fees if they attend Rose State College, a community college in Midwest City, through the Ticket to Rose program.

See also 

 Spencer, Oklahoma

External links 

 History of Star Spencer - official website

References 

Public high schools in Oklahoma
Schools in Oklahoma County, Oklahoma